The Western Lacrosse Association (WLA) is a men's Senior A box lacrosse sanctioned by the Canadian Lacrosse Association. It consists of seven teams, based in cities throughout southwestern British Columbia. Each year, the playoff teams battle for the right to compete against the Major Series Lacrosse champion for the Mann Cup every September. The championship is hosted alternately between Ontario and British Columbia every year.

The calibre of lacrosse in the WLA is very high, as the majority of its players also play in the National Lacrosse League during the winter months, while the WLA schedule runs from mid-May to August.

The teams
The league consists of the following teams:

League history

 Box lacrosse adopted by British Columbia Amateur Lacrosse Association on May 4, 1932
 1932-1933: Senior Box Lacrosse League (under BCALA umbrella)
 1934-1967: Inter-City Lacrosse League (ICLL)
 1968: National Lacrosse Association (Western Division)
 1969–present: Western Lacrosse Association

League champions 
1969: New Westminster Labatt Blues

1970: New Westminster Salmonbellies

1971: New Westminster Salmonbellies

1972: New Westminster Salmonbellies

1973: Vancouver Burrards

1974: New Westminster Salmonbellies

1975: Vancouver Burrards

1976: New Westminster Salmonbellies

1977: Vancouver Burrards

1978: Victoria Shamrocks

1979: Victoria Shamrocks

1980: New Westminster Salmonbellies

1981: New Westminster Salmonbellies

1982: New Westminster Salmonbellies

1983: Victoria Payless

1984: Victoria Payless

1985: New Westminster Salmonbellies

1986: New Westminster Salmonbellies

1987: New Westminster Salmonbellies

1988: Coquitlam Adanacs

1989: New Westminster Salmonbellies

1990: Vancouver Burrards

1991: New Westminster Salmonbellies

1992: New Westminster Salmonbellies

1993: Coquitlam Adanacs

1994: New Westminster Salmonbellies

1995: New Westminster Salmonbellies

1996: Victoria Shamrocks

1997: Coquitlam Adanacs

1998: Victoria Shamrocks

1999: Victoria Shamrocks

2000: Victoria Shamrocks

2001: Coquitlam Adanacs

2002: Victoria Shamrocks

2003: Victoria Shamrocks

2004: Victoria Shamrocks

2005: Victoria Shamrocks

2006: Victoria Shamrocks

2007: Coquitlam Adanacs

2008: New Westminster Salmonbellies

2009: New Westminster Salmonbellies

2010: New Westminster Salmonbellies

2011: Langley Thunder

2012: Langley Thunder

2013: Victoria Shamrocks

2014: Victoria Shamrocks

2015: Victoria Shamrocks

2016: Maple Ridge Burrards

2017: New Westminster Salmonbellies

2018: Maple Ridge Burrards

2019: Victoria Shamrocks

2020: no season

2021: no season

2022: Langley Thunder

Teams in bold = Mann Cup winner

Current team history

New Westminster Salmonbellies
 1888–1931 founded on May 12, 1888; played as field lacrosse club
 1932–1950 New Westminster Salmonbellies (merged with New Westminster Adanacs)
 1951–1951 New Westminster Commandos
 1952–1953 New Westminster Salmonacs
 1954–1954 New Westminster Royals
 1955–1958 New Westminster Salmonbellies
 1959–1965 New Westminster O'Keefes
 1966–present New Westminster Salmonbellies

Maple Ridge Burrards
 1937–1937 Vancouver Burrard Olympics
 1938–1949 Vancouver Burrards
 1950–1950 Vancouver Burrard Westerns	(merged with Richmond Farmers)
 1951–1951 Vancouver Combines
 1952–1958 Vancouver Pilseners
 1959–1969 Vancouver Carlings
 1970–1993 Vancouver Burrards (transferred to Surrey)
 1994–1995 Surrey Burrards (transferred to Maple Ridge)
 1996–present Maple Ridge Burrards

Victoria Shamrocks
 1950–1982 Victoria Shamrocks
 1983–1993 Victoria Payless
 1994–present Victoria Shamrocks

Coquitlam Adanacs
 1965–1967 Coquitlam Adanacs (transferred to Portland)
 1968–1968 Portland Adanacs (transferred to Coquitlam)
 1969–present Coquitlam Adanacs

Burnaby Lakers
 1986–1989 Richmond Outlaws (transferred to Burnaby)
 1990–present Burnaby Lakers

Langley Thunder
 1994–1999 North Shore Indians (transferred to Kelowna)
 2000–2001 Okanagan Thunder (transferred to North Vancouver)
 2002–2003 North Shore Thunder (transferred to Langley)
 2004–present Langley Thunder

Nanaimo Timbermen
 2005–present Nanaimo Timbermen

Defunct teams

the Indians
 1932–1932 North Vancouver Squamish Indians
 1935–1941 North Shore Indians (suspended operations during World War II)
 1945–1945 Indian Arrows
 1946–1951 North Shore Indians
 1952–1954 PNE Indians
 1955–1955 Mount Pleasant Indians (merged with Vancouver Pilseners)

Vancouver Athletic Club / Abbotsford Hotel
 1932–1932 Vancouver Athletic Club (renamed Abbotsford Hotel)
 1933–1933 Vancouver Abbotsford Hotel

New Westminster Adanacs
 1933–1941 New Westminster Adanacs (suspended operations during World War II)
 1945–1950 New Westminster Adanacs (merged with New Westminster Salmonbellies)

Richmond Farmers
 1933–1934 Vancouver St. Helen's Hotel (transferred to Richmond)
 1935–1936 Richmond Farmers (merged with Vancouver Home Gas)
 1937–1937 Richmond-Homes Combines
 1938–1941 Richmond Farmers
 1942–1942 Burrard Drydock 'Wallaces United'
 1943–1949 Richmond Farmers (transferred to Vancouver-Kerrisdale)
 1950–1950 Richmond-Kerrisdale 'Arkays' (merged with Vancouver Burrard Westerns)

Vancouver Bluebirds / Home Gas
 1934–1935 Vancouver Province Bluebirds
 1936–1936 Vancouver Home Gas (merged with Richmond Farmers)

"Norvans"
 1942–1942 North Vancouver Ship Repair Yard 'Norvans'

Military teams
 1943–1944 Vancouver Army
 1944–1944 Vancouver HMCS Discovery Navy

Nanaimo
 1951–1954 Nanaimo Native Sons
 1955–1958 Nanaimo Timbermen
 1959–1964 Nanaimo Labatts
 1975–1981 Nanaimo Timbermen

Burnaby
 1962–1962 Burnaby Norburns

See also
Lacrosse
Box lacrosse
British Columbia Lacrosse Association
Major Series Lacrosse
Ontario Lacrosse Association

External links
Western Lacrosse Association official website

 
1
1932 establishments in British Columbia